Rajko Krivokapić (born March 20, 1986) is a Montenegrin basketball coach. He currently serves as a head coach for the Teodo Tivat of the Montenegrin Basketball League and the Adriatic Second League.

Coaching career 
On February 4, 2018, Krivokapić became a head coach for the Montenegrin team Teodo Tivat.

References

External links 
 Krivokapic ABA League Profile
 Coach Profile at eurobasket.com

1986 births
Living people
KK Teodo Tivat coaches
Montenegrin basketball coaches
People from Kotor